Karlsson is a Scandinavian patronymic surname meaning "son of Karl" or "Karl's son". It is one of the most common surnames in Sweden and has a number of alternative spellings. Apart from Karlsson, Carlsson is the most common spelling variation. Karlson and Carlson also exist, but are  uncommon, as are Carlzon and Qarlsson (Annika Qarlsson). The parallel Danish-Norwegian forms are Karlsen and Carlsen.

The surname is also found in Iceland, where it is not strictly a surname, but a patronymic.

Geographical distribution

As of 2014, 92.3% of all known bearers of the surname Karlsson were residents of Sweden, 2.8% of Finland and 1.2% of Norway.

In Sweden, the frequency of the surname was higher than national average (1:52) in the following counties:
 Kalmar (1:21)
 Kronoberg (1:24)
 Östergötland (1:28)
 Blekinge (1:29)
 Örebro (1:32)
 Jönköping (1:33)
 Södermanland (1:33)
 Värmland (1:37)
 Halland (1:38)
 Västra Götaland (1:44)

In Finland, the frequency of the surname was higher than national average (1:945) in the following regions:
 Åland (1:25)
 Southwest Finland (1:344)
 Ostrobothnia (region) (1:593)
 Uusimaa (1:724)

A
 Allan Karlsson (skier) (1911–1991), Swedish cross country skier
 Allan Karlsson (footballer), Swedish former footballer
 Anders Carlsson (politician) (born 1951), Swedish social democratic politician
 Anders Karlsson (physicist) (born 1964), Swedish physicist
 Andreas Karlsson (born 1975), Swedish ice hockey player
 Ann-Ewa Karlsson (born 1955), Swedish Olympic high jumper
 Ann-Marie Karlsson (born 1968), Swedish cross country skier
 Arne Karlsson (sailor) (born 1936), Swedish sailboat racer
 Arne Karlsson (sport shooter) (born 1946), Swedish sports shooter
 Arvid Carlsson (1923–2018), Swedish neuroscientist, Nobel Prize in 2000
 Åsa Karlsson (born 1973), Swedish politician

B
 Bert Karlsson (born 1945), Swedish record company manager and politician
 Bertil Karlsson (1919–2012), Swedish athlete
 Bo Karlsson (born 1949), Swedish football referee

C
 Christoffer Karlsson (born 1988), Swedish football (soccer) player
 Conny Karlsson (shot putter) (born 1975), Finnish shot putter

D
 David Karlsson (disambiguation)

E
 Einar Karlsson (1908–1980), Swedish wrestler
 Erik Karlsson (born 1990), Swedish ice hockey player
 Evie (singer) (full name Evie Karlsson, born 1956), U.S. Contemporary Christian music singer

F
 Fred Karlsson (born 1946), Finnish professor of general linguistics

H
 Håkan Karlsson (born 1970), Swedish freestyle swimmer
 Hans Karlsson (born 1946), Swedish Social Democratic politician
 Herbert Carlsson (1896–1952), Swedish football (soccer) player
 Hjalmar Karlsson (1906–1992), Swedish sailboat racer

I
 Ingvar Carlsson (born 1934), Swedish politician, Prime Minister of Sweden

J
 Jan O. Karlsson (1939–2016), Swedish politician
 Janne Karlsson (ice hockey, born 1958) (born 1958), Swedish ice hockey player
 Jens Karlsson (born 1982), Swedish ice hockey player
 Jonas Karlsson (born 1971), Swedish actor and author

K
 Kent Karlsson (born 1945), Swedish football manager
 Kettil Karlsson (Vasa) (1433–1465), Swedish clergyman and regent of Sweden
 Kim Karlsson, Swedish ice hockey player
 Kjell-Erik Karlsson (born 1946), Swedish Left Party politician

L
 Lars Karlsson (handballer) (born 1948), Swedish handball player
 Lars Erik Karlsson, Swedish darts player
 Lars Karlsson (ice hockey) (born 1960), Swedish ice hockey player
 Louise Karlsson (born 1974), Swedish swimmer

M
 Magnus Karlsson (speedway rider) (born 1981), Swedish speedway rider
 Magnus Karlsson (bandy) (born 1984), Swedish bandy player
 Magnus Karlsson (musician) (born 1973), guitarist with heavy metal band Primal Fear
 Mandel Karlsson (since 1932), alias 91:an Karlsson, Swedish cartoon character in 91:an
 Maria Karlsson (footballer, born 1983), Swedish footballer
 Maria Karlsson (footballer, born 1985), Swedish footballer
 Markus Karlsson (footballer, born 1972), Swedish football (soccer) player for Djurgården
 Markus Karlsson (footballer, born 1979), Swedish football (soccer) player for Degerfors and AIK
 Markus Karlsson (footballer, born 2004), Swedish football (soccer) player for Hammarby
 Markus Karlsson (ice hockey) (born 1988), Swedish ice hockey defenceman
 Mikael Karlsson (born 1976, "Mikael Max" since 2003), Swedish speedway rider
 Mikael Karlsson, better known as Vigilante Carlstroem, guitarist of the Swedish rock band The Hives

N
 Niklas Karlsson (born 1974), Swedish politician
 Nils Karlsson (1917–2012), known as Mora-Nisse, Swedish cross-country skier

O

P
 Per Karlsson (born 1986), Swedish football (soccer) player

Q

R
 Robert Karlsson (born 1969), Swedish golfer
 Runar Karlsson (born 1953), Swedish/Åland politician

S
 Sebastian Karlsson (singer) (born 1985), Swedish singer and performer in Idol 2005
 Simon Karlsson Adjei (born 1993), Swedish footballer
 Sonia Karlsson (born 1946), Swedish social democratic politician

T
 Therese Karlsson (born 1972), Finnish singer and actor
 Thomas Karlsson (born 1972), Swedish writer and heavy metal lyricist

U
 Ulrika Karlsson (born 1973), Swedish politician of the Moderate Party

V
 Viktor Karlsson (born 1988), Swedish bandy player

W
 William Karlsson (born 1993), Swedish ice hockey player

X

Y

Z

See also

 Karlsson-on-the-Roof, a 1955 character in a series of children's books

Icelandic-language surnames
Swedish-language surnames
Patronymic surnames
Surnames from given names